The 1978 Dayton Pro Tennis Classic, was a men's tennis tournament played on indoor carpet courts at the Dayton Convention Center in Dayton, Ohio, in the United States that was part of the 1978 Grand Prix. It was the fifth edition of the event and was held from March 28 through April 2, 1978. First-seeded Brian Gottfried won his second singles title at the event after 1975 and earned $12,750 first-prize money..

Finals

Singles
 Brian Gottfried defeated  Eddie Dibbs 2–6, 6–4, 7–6(7–4)
 It was Gottfried's 2nd singles title of the year and the 14th of his career.

Doubles
 Brian Gottfried /  Geoff Masters defeated  Hank Pfister /  Butch Walts 6–3, 6–4

References

External links
 ITF tournament edition details

Dayton Pro Tennis Classic
Dayton Pro Tennis Classic
Dayton Pro Tennis Classic